Wimbledon Championships, is an annual tennis tournament first contested in 1877 and played on outdoor grass courts at the All England Lawn Tennis and Croquet Club (AELTC) in the Wimbledon suburb of London, United Kingdom. The ladies' singles was started in 1884.

History
Wimbledon has historically been played in the last week of June and the first week of July (though changed to the first two weeks of July in 2017), and has been chronologically the third of the four Grand Slam tournaments of the tennis season since 1987. The event was not held from 1915 to 1918 because of World War I and again from 1940 to 1945 because of World War II. The tournament was also not contested in 2020 due to the COVID-19 pandemic.

The ladies' singles' rules have undergone several changes since the first edition. From 1886 until 1921, the event started with a knockout phase, the all comers' singles, whose winner then faced the defending champion in a challenge round. The all comers' winner was automatically awarded the title eleven times (1889, 1890, 1891, 1894, 1895, 1898, 1903, 1908, 1909, 1912, 1913) in the absence of the previous year's champion. The challenge round system was abolished with the 1922 edition. Since the first championships, all matches have been played at the best-of-three sets. Between 1877 and 1883, the winner of the next game at five games-all took the set in every match except the all comers' final, and the challenge round, which were won with six games and a two games advantage. All sets were decided in two-game advantage format from 1884 to 1970. The lingering death best-of-12 points tie-break was introduced in 1971 for the first two sets, played at eight games-all until 1978 and at six games-all since 1979.

The ladies' singles champion receives a sterling silver salver commonly known as the "Venus Rosewater Dish", or simply the "Rosewater Dish". The salver, which is 18.75 inches (about 48 cm) in diameter, is decorated with figures from mythology. New singles champions are traditionally elected honorary members of the AELTC by the club's committee. In 2012, the ladies' singles winner received prize money of £1,150,000.

In the Amateur–challenge round era, Dorothea Lambert Chambers (1903–1904, 1906, 1910–1911, 1913–1914) holds the record for most titles, with seven. However, it's noteworthy that three of Chambers' titles were won in the challenge round. Lottie Dod (1891–1893) and Suzanne Lenglen (1919–1921) hold the record for most consecutive wins in the ladies' singles with three victories each. The record for most wins and most consecutive wins post-challenge round in the Amateur Era, belongs to Helen Wills Moody (1927–1930, 1932–1933, 1935, 1938) with eight, including four straight victories (1927–1930).

In the Open Era, since the inclusion of the professional tennis players, Martina Navratilova (1978–1979, 1982–1987, 1990) holds the record for most victories with nine. Navratilova holds the record for most consecutive victories with six (1982–1987).

This event has been won without the loss of a set during the Open Era, by the following players: Billie Jean King in 1968, 1972, 1973 and 1975, Margaret Court in 1970, Evonne Goolagong Cawley in 1971 and 1980, Chris Evert in 1974 and 1981, Martina Navratilova in 1979, 1983, 1984, 1986, 1987, and 1990, Steffi Graf in 1992 and 1996, Jana Novotná in 1998, Lindsay Davenport in 1999, Venus Williams in 2000, 2007 and 2008, Serena Williams in 2002, 2009, 2010, 2015 and 2016, Petra Kvitová in 2011 and 2014 and Marion Bartoli in 2013.

Champions

Amateur Era

Open Era

Statistics

Multiple champions

Championships by country

See also
Wimbledon Open other competitions
List of Wimbledon gentlemen's singles champions
List of Wimbledon gentlemen's doubles champions 
List of Wimbledon ladies' doubles champions
List of Wimbledon mixed doubles champions

Grand Slam women's singles
List of Australian Open women's singles champions
List of French Open women's singles champions
List of US Open women's singles champions
List of Grand Slam women's singles champions

Notes

References
General

Specific

External links
 The Championships, Wimbledon official website

Ladies
Wimbledon Singles champions
Wimbledon